The 1998 Dallas Cowboys season was the Cowboys' 39th season in the NFL. The Cowboys were looking to improve on their 6–10 mark from the year before and head to the Super Bowl for the final time in the 1990s. 

After the previous season, head coach Barry Switzer resigned after four seasons in which he led the Cowboys to the playoffs three times and won Super Bowl XXX. Chan Gailey, who had been offensive coordinator with the Pittsburgh Steelers, was hired as his replacement. 

The Cowboys did manage to record a 10–6 record and once again win the NFC East as they had done in the five seasons prior to 1997. However, the Cowboys did not advance beyond the Wild Card round as they were upset by the Arizona Cardinals, who had not won a playoff game since 1947, when the franchise was based in Chicago. The Cowboys would not win another NFC East title until 2007.

Offseason

NFL Draft

Regular season
Gailey would revitalize the Cowboys offense, particularly the running game, which had seen a recent decline despite the presence of running back Emmitt Smith. The trio of Smith, Troy Aikman, and Michael Irvin helped the Cowboys be the first ever NFC East team to sweep their division en route to capturing the NFC East title, the team's sixth of the 90's.  The Cowboys would later encounter the Arizona Cardinals for the third time that season in the NFC Wild Card Game, but would lose in a stunning upset in the first round at Texas Stadium.  Cornerback Deion Sanders suffered an injury to his toe in a regular season victory over Arizona and made a surprise return against them in the playoff loss.

Aikman was injured in a week two loss at Denver and missed the next five games.  Future Cowboys Head Coach Jason Garrett started all games during Aikman's absence and went 3–2 as the starting quarterback.

Notable additions to the team that year include defensive end Greg Ellis and offensive tackle Flozell Adams.  Ellis was drafted with the 8th pick in the first round. Many were stunned that the Cowboys didn't draft Randy Moss (most likely for his off-the-field issues).

Schedule

Note: Intra-division opponents are in bold text.

Standings

Playoffs

Roster

Publications
 The Football Encyclopedia 
 Total Football 
 Cowboys Have Always Been My Heroes

References

External links
 
 Pro Football Hall of Fame
 Dallas Cowboys Official Site

Dallas Cowboys seasons
Dallas
NFC East championship seasons
Dallas